Class D: History, General and Old World is a classification used by the Library of Congress Classification system. This article outlines the subclasses of Class D.

D – History (General) 
1–2009..................History (General)
1–24.5.................General
25–27..................Military and naval history
31–34..................Political and diplomatic history
51–90..................Ancient history
101–110.5..............Medieval and modern history, 476–
111–203................Medieval history
135–149...............Migrations
151–173...............Crusades
175–195...............Latin Kingdom of Jerusalem. Latin Orient, 1099–1291
200–203...............Later medieval. 11th–15th centuries
(204)–(475) ...........Modern history, 1453–
219–234...............1453–1648
242–283.5.............1601–1715. 17th century
251–271..............Thirty Years’ War, 1618–1648
274.5–274.6..........Anglo-French War, 1666–1667
275–276..............War of Devolution, 1667–1668
277–278.5............Dutch War, 1672–1678
279–280.5............War of the Grand Alliance, 1688–1697
281–283.5............War of Spanish Succession, 1701–1714
284–297...............1715–1789. 18th century
291–294..............War of Austrian Succession, 1740–1748
297..................Seven Years’ War, 1756–1763
299–(475) ............1789–
301–309..............Period of the French Revolution
351–400..............19th century. 1801–1914/1920
371–(379) ..........Eastern question
383.................1815–1830. Congress of Vienna
385–393.............1830–1870
394–400.............1871– . Later 19th century
410–(475) ...........20th century
461–(475) ..........Eastern question
501–680...............World War I (1914–1918)
720–728...............Period between World Wars (1919–1939)
731–838...............World War II (1939–1945)
839–860...............Post–war history (1945– )
880–888...............Developing countries
890–893...............Eastern Hemisphere
900–2009..............Europe (General)
901–980..............Description and travel
1050–2009............History

DA – History of Great Britain – History of Ireland – History of the British Isles 
1–995.................History of Great Britain
10–18.2..............British Empire. Commonwealth of Nations. The Commonwealth
20–690...............England
20–27.5.............General
28–592..............History
28–35..............General
40–89.6............Political, military, naval, and Air Force history. Foreign relations
90–125.............Antiquities. Social life and customs. Ethnography
129–592............By period
129–260...........Early and medieval to 1485
140–199..........Celts. Romans. Saxons. Danes. Normans
200–260..........1154–1485. Angevins. Plantagenets. Lancaster–York
300–592...........Modern, 1485–
310–360..........Tudors, 1485–1603
350–360.........Elizabeth I, 1558–1603. Elizabethan age
385–398..........Early Stuarts, 1603–1642
400–429..........Civil War and Commonwealth, 1642–1660
430–463..........Later Stuarts
498–503..........1714–1760
505–522..........George III, 1760–1820
550–565..........Victorian era, 1837–1901
566–592..........20th century
600–667.............Description and travel. Guidebooks
670–690.............Local history and description
670................Counties, regions, etc., A–Z
675–689............London
690................Other cities, towns, etc., A–Z
700–745..............Wales
700–713.............General
714–722.1...........History
725–738.............Description and travel
740–745.............Local history and description
750–890..............Scotland
750–757.7...........General
757.9–826...........History
757.9–763..........General
765–774.5..........Political and military history. Antiquities, etc.
774.8–826..........By period
777–790...........Early and medieval to 1603
783.2–783.45.....War of Independence, 1285–1371
783.5–790........Stuarts, 1371–1603
800–814.5.........1603–1707/1745
807..............The Union, 1707
813–814.5.......1707–1745. Jacobite movements
815–826..........19th–20th centuries
850–878............Description and travel
880–890............Local history and description
900–995.............Ireland
900–908.7..........General
909–965............History
909–916.8.........General
920–927...........Antiquities. Social life and customs. Ethnography
930–965...........By period
930–937.5........Early and medieval to 1603
933.3..........English conquest, 1154–1189
938–965.........Modern, 1603–
949.5..........The Union, 1800
949.7–965......19th–20th centuries. Irish question
963...........1922– . Republic of Ireland. Irish Free State
969–988...........Description and travel
990–995...........Local history and description
990.U45–U46.....Northern Ireland (Ulster)

DAW – History of Central Europe 
1001–1051...........History of Central Europe
1001–1028..........General
1031–1051..........History

DB – History of Austria – Liechtenstein – Hungary – Czechoslovakia 
1–3150..................History of Austria. Liechtenstein. Hungary. Czechoslovakia
1–879..................Austria. Austro-Hungarian Empire
1–20.5................General
21–27.5...............Description and travel
29–34.5...............Antiquities. Social life and customs. Ethnography
35–99.2...............History
35–40.5..............General
42–49................Military, naval, and political history. Foreign relations.
51–99.2..............By period
51–64...............Early and medieval to 1521
60–64..............Wars with the Turks
65–99.2..............1521–
65.2–65.9...........1521–1648
66–69.5.............1648–1740
69.7–77.............1740–1815
80–99.2.............19th–20th centuries
83.................Revolution, 1848
96–99.2............Republic, 1918–
99–99.1...........1938–1955. German annexation. Allied occupation
99.2..............1955–
101–879...............Local history and description
101–785..............Provinces, regions, etc.
841–860..............Vienna
879..................Other cities, towns, etc., A–Z
881–898................Liechtenstein
901–999................Hungary
901–906.7..............General
906.9–920.5............Description and travel. Antiquities. Ethnography
921–958.6..............History
927–958.6..............By period
927–932.9.............Early to 1792
929–929.8............Árpád dynasty, 896–1301
929.95–931.9.........Elective kings, 1301–1526
932.95–945............1792–1918. 19th century
934.5–939.5..........Revolution of 1848–1849
940–945..............1849–1918
946–958.6.............20th century
955–955.8............1918–1945. Revolution of 1919–1920
955.9–957.5..........1945–1989. Revolution of 1956
957.9–958.6..........1989–
974.9–999...............Local history and description
974.9–975..............Counties, regions, etc.
981–997................Budapest
2000–3150................Czechoslovakia
2000–2035...............General. Description and travel. Antiquities. Social life and customs
2040–2043...............Ethnography
2044–2247..............History
2080–2247..............By period
2080–2133.............Early and medieval to 1526
2135–2182............Habsburg rule, 1526–1918
2185–2241............Czechoslovak Republic, 1918–1992
2242–2247............1993– . Independent Czech Republic
2300–2650..............Local history and description of Czech lands
2300–2421.............Moravia
2600–2649.............Prague (Praha)
2700–3150..............Slovakia
3100–3139............. Bratislava (Pressburg)

DC – History of France – Andorra – Monaco 
1–947...................History of France
1–20.5.................General
21–29.3................Description and travel
30–34.5................Antiquities. Social life and customs. Ethnography
35–424.................History
35–41.................General
44–59.8...............Military, naval, and political history. Foreign relations
60–424................By period
60–109...............Early and medieval to 1515
62–64...............Gauls. Celts. Franks
64.7–94.............476–1328. Merovingians. Carlovingians. Capetians
95–109..............1328–1515
96–101.7...........Hundred Years' War, 1339–1453
101.9–109..........15th century. Jeanne d'Arc, Saint
110–424..............Modern, 1515–
111–120.............1515–1589. 16th century
118................Massacre of St. Bartholomew, 1572
120.8–130...........1589–1715. Henri IV, Louis XIII, Louis XIV
131–138.............1715–1789. 18th century. Louis XV, Louis XVI
139–249.............Revolutionary and Napoleonic period, 1789–1815
251–354.9...........19th century
256–260............Restoration, 1815–1830
261–269............July Revolution of 1830. July Monarchy, 1830–1848
270–274.5..........February Revolution and Second Republic
275–280.5..........Second Empire, 1852–1870
281–326.5..........Franco-German or Franco-Prussian War, 1870–1871
330–354.9..........Later 19th century
361–424.............20th century
397................1940–1946
398–409............Fourth Republic, 1947–1958
411–424............Fifth Republic, 1958–
600–801................Local history and description
601.1–609.83..........North, East, etc. France
611...................Regions, provinces, departments, etc., A–Z
701–790...............Paris
801...................Other cities, towns, etc., A–Z
921–930................Andorra
941–947................Monaco

DD – History of Germany 
1–(905)..................History of Germany
1–21....................General
21.5–43.................Description and travel
51–78...................Antiquities. Social life and customs. Ethnography
84–257.4................History
84–96..................General
99–120.................Military, naval, and political history. Foreign relations
121–257.4..............By period
121–124...............Earliest to 481
125–174.6.............Early and medieval to 1519
126–155..............Medieval Empire, 481–1273
127–135.............481–918. Merovingians. Carolingians
136–144.............919–1125. Houses of Saxony and Franconia
145–155.............1125–1273. Hohenstaufen period
156–174.6............1273–1519. Houses of Habsburg and Luxemburg
175–257.4..............Modern, 1519–
176–189..............1519–1648. Reformation and Counter-Reformation
181–183.............Peasants’ War, 1524–1525
184–184.7........... Schmalkaldic League and War, 1530–1547
189.................Period of Thirty Years’ War, 1618–1648
190–199..............1648–1815. 18th century. French Revolutionary and Napoleonic period
201–257.4............19th–20th centuries
206–216.............1815–1871
217–231.............New Empire, 1871–1918
228.8..............Period of World War I, 1914–1918
233–257.4...........Revolution and Republic, 1918–
253–256.8..........Hitler, 1933–1945. National socialism
(256) ............Period of World War II, 1939–1945
257–257.4..........Period of Allied occupation, 1945–
258–262.................West Germany
280–289.5...............East Germany
301–454.................Prussia
301–312................General
314–320................Description and travel
325–339................Antiquities. Social life and customs. Ethnography
341–454................History
701–901.................Local history and description
701–788................North and Central, Northeast, etc. Germany
801....................States, provinces, regions, etc., A–Z
851–900................Berlin
900.2–900.76...........Bonn
901....................Other cities, towns, etc., A–Z

DE – History of the Greco-Roman World 
1–100............History of the Greco-Roman World
1–15.5..........General
23–31...........Geography
46–73.2.........Antiquities. Civilization. Culture. Ethnography
80–100..........History

DF – History of Greece 
10–951..................History of Greece
10–289.................Ancient Greece
10–16.................General
27–41.................Geography. Travel
75–136................Antiquities. Civilization. Culture. Ethnography
207–241...............History
207–218..............General
220–241..............By period
220–221.............Bronze Age, Minoan, and Mycenaean ages
221.2–224...........ca. 1125–500 B.C. Age of Tyrants
225–226.............Persian wars, 499–479 B.C.
227–228.............Athenian supremacy. Age of Pericles. 479–431 B.C.
229–230.............Peloponnesian War, 431–404 B.C.
230.9–231.9.........Spartan and Theban supremacies, 404–362 B.C.
232.5–233.8.........Macedonian epoch. Age of Philip. 359–336 B.C.
234–234.9...........Alexander the Great, 336–323 B.C.
235–238.9...........Hellenistic period, 323–146.B.C.
239–241.............Roman epoch, 140 B.C.–323/476 A.D.
251–289................Local history and description
501–649.................Medieval Greece. Byzantine Empire, 323–1453
501–518................General
520–542.4..............Antiquities. Social life and customs. Ethnography
545–548................Military history. Political history. Empire and papacy
550–649................History
550–552.8.............General
553–599.5.............Eastern Empire, 323/476–1057. Constantine the Great
599.8–649.............1057–1453
610–629..............1204–1261. Latin Empire
630–649..............1261–1453. Palaeologi
645–649..............1453. Fall of Constantinople
701–951.................Modern Greece
701–720................General
720.5–728..............Description and travel
741–748................Social life and customs. Ethnography
750–854.32.............History
750–760...............General
765–787...............Military, naval, and political history. Foreign relations
801–854.32............By period
801–801.9............Turkish rule, 1453–1821
802–832..............1821–1913
804–815.............War of Independence, 1821–1829
816–818.............Kapodistrias, 1827–1831
833–854.32...........20th century
848.................Republic, 1924–1935
895–951................Local history and description
901...................Regions, provinces, islands, etc., A–Z
901.C78–C88..........Crete
915–936...............Athens
951...................Other cities, towns, etc., A–Z

DG – History of Italy – Malta 
11–999....................History of Italy
11–365...................Ancient Italy. Rome to 476
11–16...................General
27–41...................Geography. Description and travel
51–70...................Local history and description
51–55..................Regions in Italy, A–Z
59.....................Regions outside of Italy, A–Z
61–69..................Rome (City) to 476
70......................Other cities, towns, etc., A–Z
75–190..................Antiquities. Civilization. Culture. Ethnography
201–365.................History
201–215................General
221–365................By period
221–225...............Pre–Roman Italy. Etruria. Etruscans
231–269...............Kings and Republic, 753–27 B.C.
233–233.9............Foundations and kings, 753–510
235–269..............Republic, 509–27
237–238.............Subjection of Italy, 343–290
241–253.............Conquest of Mediterranean world. 264–133
242–249.4..........First and Second Punic Wars. Illyrian wars. 264–201
250–253............Wars in the East and in the West. 200–133
253.5–269...........Fall of the Republic. Establishment of the Empire. 133–27
256–260............Period of Marius and Sulla (Pompey). 111–78
261–267............Julius Caesar. First Triumvirate, 60
268–269............Second Triumvirate, 43–31
269.5–365.............Empire, 27 B.C. – 476 A.D.
269.5–274.3..........General
275–309.3............Constitutional Empire, 27 B.C. – 284 A.D.
310–365..............284–476. Decline and fall
401–583.8................Medieval and modern Italy, 476–
401–421.................General
421.5–430.2.............Description and travel
431–457.................Antiquities. Social life and customs. Ethnography
461–583.8...............History
461–473................General
480–499................Military, naval, and political history. Foreign relations
500–583.8..............By period
500–537.8.............Medieval, 476–1492
503–529..............476–1268
506–514.7...........489–774. Gothic and Lombard kingdoms. Byzantine exarchate, 553–568
515–529.............774–1268. Frankish and German emperors
530–537.8............1268–1492
532–537.8...........Renaissance
538–583.8.............Modern, 1492–
539–545.8............16th–18th centuries
546–549..............1792–1815. Napoleonic period
548–549.............Kingdom of Italy
550.5–564............19th century
552–554.5...........1848–1871. Risorgimento
553–553.5..........1848–1849. Austro-Sardinian War
555–575..............1871–1947. United Italy (Monarchy)
571–572.............1919–1945. Fascism
576–583.8............1948– . Republic
600–684.72...............Northern Italy
600–609.................General
610–618.78..............Piedmont. Savoy
631–645.................Genoa
651–664.5...............Milan. Lombardy
670–684.72..............Venice
691–817.3................Central Italy
691–694.................General
731–759.3..............Tuscany. Florence
791–800................ Papal States (States of the Church). Holy See. Vatican City
803–817.3..............Rome (Modern city)
819–875.................Southern Italy
819–829................General
831....................Sicily and Malta
840–857.5..............Naples. Kingdom of the Two Sicilies
861–875................Sicily
975.....................Other cities (non–metropolitan), provinces, etc., A–Z
987–999.................Malta. Maltese Islands

DH – History of Low Countries – Benelux Countries 
1–925..................History of Low Countries.  Benelux Countries
1–23..................General
31–40.................Description and travel
51–92.................Antiquities. Social life and customs. Ethnography
95–207................History
95–109...............General
113–137..............Military, naval, and political history. Foreign relations
141–207..............By period
141–162.............Early and medieval to 1384
171–184.............1384–1555. House of Burgundy
185–207.............Wars of Independence, 1555–1648
401–811...............Belgium
401–430..............General
431–435..............Description and travel
451–492..............Antiquities. Social life and customs. Ethnography
503–694..............History
503–527.............General
540–569.............Military, naval, and political history. Foreign relations
571–694.............By period
571–584............Early and medieval to 1555
585–619............1555–1794. Spanish and Austrian rule
611–619...........1714–1794. Austrian Netherlands
620–676............1794–1909
631................French rule, 1794–1813
650–652............Revolution of 1830
677–694............20th century
801–811..............Local history and description
801.................Provinces, regions, etc., A–Z
802–809.95..........Brussels
811.................Other cities, towns, etc., A–Z
901–925...............Luxembourg

DJ – History of the Netherlands (Holland) 
1–(500)................History of Netherlands (Holland)
1–30..................General
33–41.................Description and travel
51–92.................Antiquities. Social life and customs. Ethnography
95–292................History
95–116...............General
124–150..............Military, naval, and political history, etc. Foreign relations
151–292..............By period
151–152.............Early and medieval to 1555
154–210.............1555–1795. United provinces
180–182............Anglo-Dutch wars, 1652–1667
190–191............War with France, 1672–1678
193................Anglo-Dutch War, 1672–1674
196–199.2..........Stadtholders, 1702–1747
205–206............Anglo-Dutch War, 1780–1784
208–209............War with France, 1793–1795
211.................1795–1806. Batavian Republic
215–292.............19th–20th centuries
401–411...............Local history and description
411.A5–A59...........Amsterdam

DJK – History of Eastern Europe (General) 
1–77.................History of Eastern Europe (General)
26–28...............Ethnography
27.................Slavic people (General)
30–51...............History
61–77...............Local history and description
61–66..............Black Seas region
71–76..............Carpathian Mountain region
76.2–76.8..........Danube River Valley
77.................Pannonia

DK – History of Russia; Soviet Union; Former Soviet Republics – History of Poland 

1–949.5..........History of Russia. Soviet Union. Former Soviet Republics
33–35.5................Ethnography
36–293.................History
70–112.42.............Early to 1613
70–99.7..............Rus’
99.8–112.42..........Muscovy
112.8–264.8...........House of Romanov, 1613–1917
265–265.95............Revolution, 1917–1921
266–292...............Soviet regime, 1918–1991
293...................1991–
500....................Regions not limited to one Republic, A–Z
501–949.5..............Local history and description
502.3–502.75..........Baltic States
503–503.95............Estonia
503.92–503.939.......Tallinn
504–504.95............Latvia
504.92–504.939.......Riga
505–505.95............Lithuania
505.92–505.939.......Vilnius
507–507.95............Belarus. Byelorussian S.S.R. White Russia
507.92–507.939.......Minsk
508–508.95............Ukraine
508.92–508.939.......Kiev
509...................Southern Soviet Union
509.1–509.95..........Moldova. Moldovian S.S.R. Bessarabia
509.92–509.939.......Chişinău. Kishinev
510–651............... Russia (Federation). Russian S.F.S.R.
541–579..............Saint Petersburg. Leningrad. Petrograd
588–609..............Moscow
670–679.5.............Georgia (Republic). Georgian S.S.R. Georgian Sakartvelo
679.2–679.39.........Tbilisi. Tiflis
680–689.5............. Armenia (Republic). Armenian S.S.R.
689.2–689.39.........Yerevan. Erevan
690–699.5.............Azerbaijan. Azerbaijan S.S.R.
699.2–699.39.........Baku
751–781................Siberia
845–860................Soviet Central Asia. West Turkestan
901–909.5..............Kazakhstan. Kazakh S.S.R.
909.2–909.39..........Alma Ata
911–919.5..............Kyrgyzstan. Kirghiz S.S.R. Kirghizia
919.2–919.39..........Frunze
921–929.5..............Tajikistan. Tajik S.S.R. Tadzhikistan
929.2–929.39..........Dushanbe
931–939.5..............Turkmenistan. Turkmen S.S.R. Turkmenia
939.2–939.39..........Ashkhabad
941–949.5..............Uzbekistan. Uzbek S.S.R.
949.2–949.39..........Tashkent
4010–4800................History of Poland
4120–4122...............Ethnography
4123–4452...............History
4186–4348..............To 1795
4348.5–4395............1795–1918
4397–4420..............1918–1945
4429–4442..............1945–1989. People's Republic
4445–4452..............1989–
4600–4800...............Local history and description
4610–4645..............Warsaw (Warszawa)
4650–4685..............Gdansk (Danzig)
4700–4735..............Krakow (Cracow)

DL – History of Northern Europe; Scandinavia 
11–6.8..................General
7–11.5.................Description and travel
20–42.5................Antiquities. Social life and customs. Ethnography
43–87..................History
43–49.................General
52–59.................Military, naval, and political history. Foreign relations
61–87.................By period
61–65................Earliest to 1387. Scandinavian Empire. Northmen. Vikings
75–81................1387–1900
83–87................1900– . Period of World War I, 1914–1918
101–291................Denmark
101–114.5.............General
115–120...............Description and travel
121–142.5.............Antiquities. Social life and customs. Ethnography
143–263.3.............History
143–151..............General
154–159.5............Military, naval, and political history. Foreign relations
160–263.3............By period
160–183.9...........Early and medieval to 1523
162–173.8..........750–1241. Norwegian rule, 1042–1047
174–183.9..........1241–1523. Union of Kalmar, 1397
184–263.3...........Modern, 1523–
185–192.8..........1523–1670
190...............War with Sweden, 1643–1645
192...............War with Sweden, 1657–1660
193–199.8..........1670–1808
196.3.............Period of Northern War, 1700–1721
201–249............1808–1906. 19th century
217–223..........Schleswig–Holstein War, 1848–1850
236–239.6........Schleswig–Holstein War, 1864
250–263.3.........20th century
269–291..............Local history and description
271.................Counties, regions, islands, etc., A–Z
276.................Copenhagen
291.................Other cities, towns, etc., A–Z
301–398...............Iceland
301–334..............General. Description and travel, etc.
335–380..............History
396–398..............Local history and description
401–596...............Norway
401–414..............General
415–419.2............Description and travel
420–442.5............Antiquities. Social life and customs. Ethnography
443–537..............History
443–451.5...........General
453–459.............Military, naval, and political history. Foreign relations
460–537.............By period
460–478............Early and medieval to 1387
480–502............1387–1814. Union of Kalmar, 1397
499..............War of 1807–1814
500–502..........Union with Sweden, 1814
503–526...........1814–1905. 19th century
525..............Dissolution of the Swedish–Norwegian union, 1905
527–537...........20th century. Period of World War II, 1939–1945
576–596............Local history and description
576...............Counties, regions, etc., A–Z
581............... Oslo (Christiania)
596...............Other cities, towns, etc., A–Z
601–991..............Sweden
601–614.5...........General
614.55–619.5........Description and travel
621–642.............Antiquities. Social life and customs. Ethnography
643–879.............History
643–651............General
654–659............Military, naval, and political history. Foreign relations
660–879............By period
660–700.9.........Early and medieval to 1523. Union of Kalmar, 1397
701–879...........Modern, 1523–
701–719.9........Vasa dynasty, 1523–1654. Gustaf II Adolf, 1611–1632
710–712.........Wars with Denmark, Russia, Poland
721–743..........Zweibrücken dynasty, 1654–1718
733–743.........Northern War, 1700–1721
747–805..........1718–1818
790.............Revolution and loss of Finland, 1809
805.............Union with Norway, 1814
807–859..........1814–1907. 19th century
860–879..........20th century
971–991.............Local history and description
971................Provinces, regions, etc., A–Z
976................Stockholm
991................Other cities, towns, etc., A–Z
1002–1180............Finland
1002–1014.5.........General
1015–1015.4.........Description and travel
1016–1022...........Antiquities. Social life and customs. Ethnography
1024–1141.6.........History
1024–1033..........General
1036–1048..........Military, naval, and political history. Foreign relations
1050–1141.6........By period
1050–1052.9.......Early to 1523
1055–1141.6.......Modern, 1523–
1070–1078........Revolution, 1917–1918. Civil War
1090–1105........1939–1945
1095–1105.......Russo-Finnish War, 1939–1940
1170–1180...........Local history and description
1170...............Regions, provinces, historical regions, etc., A–Z
1175–1175.95....... Helsinki (Helsingfors)
1180...............Other cities, towns, etc., A–Z

DP – History of Spain – Portugal 
1–402..................History of Spain
1–27..................General
27.5–43.2.............Description and travel
44–53.................Antiquities. Social life and customs. Ethnography
56–272.4..............History
56–75................General
76–86................Military, naval, and political history. Foreign relations
91–272.4.............By period
91–96...............Earliest to 711
92–96..............Pre–Roman, Roman, and Gothic periods
97.3–160.8...........711–1516. Moorish domination and the Reconquest
100–123.............Moors in Spain. Córdoba. Kingdom of Granada
124–133.7...........Aragon (Catalonia)
134–143.8...........Castile and Leon
145–152.8...........León (Asturias)
153–160.8...........Navarre
161–272.4............Modern Spain, 1479/1516–
161.5–166...........1479–1516. Fernando V and Isabel I
170–189.............1516–1700. Habsburgs
192–200.8...........1700–1808. Bourbons
201–232.6...........1808–1886. 19th century
204–208............1808–1814. Napoleonic period
212–220............1814–1868. Bourbon restoration
219–219.2.........Carlist War, 1833–1840
222–232.6...........1868–1886
224–226............Revolution, 1868–1870
230–231.5..........First Republic, 1873–1875
233–272.4............20th century. 1886–
250–269.9...........Second Republic, 1931–1939
269–269.9..........Civil War, 1936–1939
269.97–271..........1939–1975
272–272.4...........1975–
285–402.................Local history and description
285–295................Northern, Northwestern, Southern Spain
302....................Provinces, regions, ets., A–Z
350–374................Madrid
402....................Other cities, towns, etc., A–Z
501–(900.22).............History of Portugal
501–520.................General
521–526.5...............Description and travel
528–534.5...............Antiquities. Social life and customs. Ethnography
535–682.2...............History
535–546................General
547–557................Military, naval, and political history. Foreign relations
558–682.2..............By period
558–618...............Early and medieval to 1580
568–578..............House of Burgundy, 1095–1383
580..................Interregnum, 1383–1385
582–618..............House of Aviz, 1385–1580
620–682.2.............1580–
622–629..............1580–1640. Spanish dynasty (Sixty years’ captivity)
632–644.9............1640–1816. House of Braganza
645–669..............1816–1908
650..................Revolution of 1820
657..................Wars of succession, 1826–1840
670–682.2............20th century
674.................Revolution of October 1910
675–682.2...........Republic, 1910– . Revolution of 1919
702–802.................Local history and description
702....................Provinces, regions, etc., A–Z
752–776................Lisbon
802....................Other cities, towns, etc., A–Z

DQ – History of Switzerland 
11–851...............History of Switzerland
1–20................General
20.5–26.............Description and travel
30–49.5.............Antiquities. Social life and customs. Ethnography
51–210..............History
51–57..............General
59–76..............Military and political history. Foreign relations
78–210.............By period
78–110............Early and medieval to 1516
79–84............Early to 687. Celts and Romans. Teutonic tribes
85–87............687–1291. Carolingian and German rule
88–110...........1291–1516. Federation and independence
111–123...........1516–1798
124–191...........19th century
131–151..........1789/1798–1815. Helvetic Republic, 1798–1803
154–161..........1815–1848. Sonderbund, 1845–1847
171–191..........1848–1900
201–210...........20th century
301–851.............Local history and description
301–800.35.........Cantons (and cantonal capitals)
820–829............Alps
841................Regions, peaks, etc., A–Z
851................Cities, towns, etc., A–Z

DR – History of the Balkan Peninsula 
11–2285....................History of Balkan Peninsula
1–11.....................General
11.5–16..................Description and travel
20–27....................Antiquities. Social life and customs. Ethnography
32–48.5..................History. Balkan War, 1912–1913
50–50.84.................Thrace
51–98....................Bulgaria
51–56.7.................General
57–60.2.................Description and travel
62–64.5.................Antiquities. Social life and customs. Ethnography
65–93.47................History
65–69.5................General
70–73..................Military and political history. Foreign relations
73.7–93.47.............By period
73.7–80.8.............Early and medieval
74.5–77.8............First Bulgarian Empire, 681–1018
79–79.25.............Greek rule, 1018–1185
80–80.8..............Second Bulgarian Empire, 1185–1396
81–84.................Turkish rule, 1396–1878
84.9–89.8.............1878–1944
89.9–93.34............1944–1990
93.4–93.47............1990–
95–98...................Local history and description
95.....................Provinces, regions, etc., A–Z
97.....................Sofia
98.....................Other cities, towns, etc., A–Z
201–296..................Romania
201–206.................General
207–210.................Description and travel
211–214.2...............Antiquities. Social life and customs. Ethnography
215–269.6...............History
215–218................General
219–229................Military, naval, and political history. Foreign relations
238–269.6..............By period
238–240.5.............Early and medieval to 1601. Roman period
241–241.5.............Phanariote regime, 1601–1822
242–249...............1822–1881. 19th century
250–266.5.............1866/1881–1944
267–267.5.............1944–1989
268–269.6.............1989–
279–296.................Local history and description
279–280.74.............Transylvania
281....................Other provinces, regions, etc., A–Z
286....................Bucharest
296....................Other cities, towns, etc., A–Z
401–741..................Turkey
401–419.................General
421–429.4...............Description and travel
431–435.................Antiquities. Social life and customs. Ethnography
436–605.................History
436–446................General
448–479................Military, naval, and political history. Foreign relations
481–605................By period
481...................Earliest to 1281/1453
485–555.7.............1281/1453–1789. Fall of Constantinople, 1453
511–529..............1566–1640. Period of decline
515–516.............Cyprian War, 1570–1571. Holy League, 1571
531–555.7............1640–1789
534.2–534.5..........War of Candia, 1644–1669
556–567...............1789–1861. 19th century
568–575...............1861–1909. War with Russia, 1877–1878
576–605...............20th century. Constitutional movement
701–741.................Local history and description (European Turkey)
701....................Provinces, regions, etc., A–Z
716–739................Istanbul (Constantinople)
741....................Other cities, towns, etc., A–Z
901–998..................Albania
901–914.5...............General
915–918.................Description and travel
921–926.................Antiquities. Social life and customs. Ethnography
927–978.52..............History
927–946................General
947–953................Military, naval, and political history. Foreign relations
954–978.52.............By period
954–960.5.............To 1501
961–969...............1501–1912. Turkish rule
969.8–978.52..........20th century
996–998.................Local history and description
996....................Provinces, regions, etc., A–Z
997....................Tirana
998....................Other cities, towns, etc., A–Z
1202–2285...............Yugoslavia
1202–1218..............General
1220–1224..............Description and travel
1227–1231..............Antiquities. Social life and customs. Ethnography
1232–1321..............History
1232–1249.............General
1250–1258.............Military, naval, and political history. Foreign relations
1259–1321.............By period
1259–1265............Early and medieval to 1500
1266–1272............1500–1800
1273–1280............1800–1918
1281–1321............1918–
1313–1313.8.........Yugoslav War, 1991–1995
1350–2285..............Local history and description
1352–1485.............Slovenia
1502–1645.............Croatia
1620–1630.5..........Dalmatia
1633–1636.5..........Slavonia
1652–1785.............Bosnia and Herzegovina
1802–1928.............Montenegro
1932–2125.............Serbia
2075–2087.7..........Kosovo
2090–2101.5..........Vojvodina
2106–2124.5..........Belgrade
2152–2285.............Macedonia

DS – History of Asia 
11–937..............History of Asia
5.95–10............Description and travel
11.................Antiquities
13–28..............Ethnography
31–35.2............History
35.3–35.77.........The Islamic World
36–39.2............Arab countries
36.9...............Ethnography
37–39.2............History
41–66...............Middle East. Southwestern Asia. Ancient Orient. Arab East. Near East
51–54.95...........Local history and description
54–54.95..........Cyprus
58–59...............Ethnography
61–66...............History
67–79.9..............Iraq (Assyria, Babylonia, Mesopotamia)
69–70.5.............Antiquities
70.8................Ethnography
70.82–79.9..........History
80–90................Lebanon (Phenicia)
80.5–80.55..........Ethnography
80.7–87.6...........History
92–99................Syria
94.7–94.8...........Ethnography
94.9–98.3...........History
99..................Provinces, regions, cities, etc.
101–151..............Israel (Palestine). The Jews
109–109.94..........Jerusalem
111–111.9............Antiquities
113.2–113.8..........Ethnography. Tribes of Israel
114–128.2............History
133–151..............Jews outside of Palestine
153–154.9.............Jordan. Transjordan
153.5–153.55.........Ethnography
153.7–154.55.........History
155–156...............Asia Minor
161–195.5.............Armenia
173–195.5............History
201–248...............Arabian Peninsula. Saudi Arabia
218–219..............Ethnography
221–244.63...........History
247–248..............Local history and description
251–326...............Iran (Persia)
260.7–262............Antiquities
268–269..............Ethnography
270–318.85...........History
324–326..............Local history and description
327–329.4.............Central Asia
331–349.9.............Southern Asia. Indian Ocean Region
349.8–349.9..........Islands of the Indian Ocean
350–375...............Afghanistan
354.5–354.6..........Ethnography
355–371.3............History
374–375..............Local history and description
376–392.2.............Pakistan
380..................Ethnography
381–389.22...........History
392–392.2............Local history and description
393–396.9............Bangladesh. East Pakistan
393.82–393.83.......Ethnography
394.5–395.7.........History
396.8–396.9.........Local history and description
401–(486.8)...........India
430–432..............Ethnography. Sects
433–481..............History
483–(486.8)..........Local history and description
488–490...............Sri Lanka
489.2–489.25.........Ethnography
489.5–489.86.........History
491–492.9.............Bhutan
493–495.8.............Nepal
498–498.8.............Goa. Portuguese in India
501–518.9.............East Asia. The Far East
518.15–518.9.........Relation of individual countries to East Asia
520–560.72............Southeastern Asia
524–526.7............History
527–530.9............Burma
531–560.72...........French Indochina
541–553.7...........History
554–554.98.........Cambodia
555–555.98.........Laos
556–559.93.........Vietnam. Annam
557–559.9.........Vietnamese Conflict
560–560.72.........Democratic Republic (North Vietnam), 1945–
561–589..............Thailand (Siam)
569–570.............Ethnography
570.95–586..........History
588–589.............Local history and description
591–599..............Malaysia. Malay Peninsula. Straits Settlements
595–595.2...........Ethnography
595.8–597.215.......History
597.22–599..........Local history and description
597.33–597.34......Sabah. British North Borneo
597.36–597.39......Sarawak
600–605..............Malay Archipelago
608–610.9............Singapore
611–649..............Indonesia (Dutch East Indies)
631–632.............Ethnography
633–644.46..........History
646.1–646.15........Sumatra
646.17–646.29.......Java
646.3–646.34........Borneo. Kalimantan, Indonesia
646.4–646.49........Celebes. Sulawesi.
646.5–646.59........Timor
646.6–646.69........Moluccas. Maluku
650–650.99...........Brunei
651–689..............Philippines
665–666.............Ethnography
667–686.62..........History
688–689.............Local history and description
701–799.9............China
730–731.............Ethnography
733–779.32..........History
781–796.............Local history and description
781–784.2..........Manchuria
785–786............Tibet
796.H7.............Hong Kong
798.................Outer Mongolia. Mongolian People's Republic
798.92–799.9........Taiwan
801–897..............Japan
833–891.5...........History
894.215–897.........Local history and description
901–937..............Korea
904.8–922.4642......History
918–921.8..........War and intervention, 1950–1953
924–925.............Local history and description
930–937.............Democratic People's Republic, 1948–

DT – History of Africa 
1:7–12.25...................Description and travel
15–16......................Ethnography
17–39......................History
43–154.....................Egypt
56.8–69.5.................Antiquities
63–63.5..................Pyramids
68–68.8..................Religious antiquities
71–72.....................Ethnography
73........................Local antiquities
74–107.87.................History
115–154...................Local history and description
139–153.5................Cairo
154.1–159.9................Sudan. Anglo-Egyptian Sudan
154.8.....................Antiquities
155–155.2.................Ethnography
155.3–157.67..............History
159.6–159.9...............Local history and description
160–177....................North Africa
167–176...................History
168–169.5................Carthaginian period
179.2–179.9................Northwest Africa
181–346....................Maghrib. Barbery States
211–239...................Libya
223–223.2................Ethnography
223.3–236................History
238–239..................Local history and description
241–269...................Tunisia (Tunis)
253–253.2................Ethnography
253.4–264.49.............History
268–269..................Local history and description
271–299...................Algeria
283–283.6................Ethnography
283.7–295.55.............History
298–299..................Local history and description
301–330...................Morocco
313–313.6................Ethnography
313.7–325.92.............History
328–329..................Local history and description
330......................Spanish Morocco
331–346...................Sahara
348–363.3..................Central Sub-Saharan Africa
365–469....................Eastern Africa
365.5–365.78..............History
367–367.8.................Northeast Africa
371–390...................Ethiopia (Abyssinia)
380–380.4................Ethnography
380.5–390................History
391–398...................Eritrea
401–409...................Somalia. Somaliland and adjacent territory
402.3–402.45.............Ethnography
402.5–407.3..............History
409......................Local history and description
411–411.9.................Djibouti. French Territory and Afars and Issas. French Somaliland
411.42–411.45............Ethnography
411.5–411.83.............History
411.9....................Local history and description
421–432.5.................East Africa. British East Africa
433.2–433.29..............Uganda
433.242–433.245..........Ethnography
433.252–433.287..........History
433.29...................Local history and description
433.5–434.................Kenya
433.542–433.545..........Ethnography
433.552–433.584..........History
436–449...................Tanzania. Tanganyika. German East Africa
443–443.3................Ethnography
443.5–448.25.............History
449.Z2..................Zanzibar
450–450.49...............Rwanda. Ruanda-Urundi
450.24–450.25...........Ethnography
450.26–450.437..........History
450.49..................Local history and description
450.5–450.95.............Burundi
450.64–450.65...........Ethnography
450.66–450.855..........History
450.95..................Local history and description
468–469..................Islands (East African coast)
469.M21–.M38............Madagascar
469.M39.................Mascarene Islands
469.M4–.M495............Mauritius (Isle de France)
469.M4975...............Mayotte
469.R3–.R5..............Réunion
469.S4–.S49.............Seychelles
470–671...................West Africa. West Coast
477......................Upper Guinea
479......................Lower Guinea
491–516.9................British West Africa
507.....................Ashanti Empire
509–509.9...............Gambia
509.42–509.45..........Ethnography
509.5–509.83...........History
509.9..................Local history and description
509.97–512.9...........Ghana (Gold Coast)
510.42–510.43.........Ethnography
510.5–512.34..........History
512.9.................Local history and description
515–515.9..............Nigeria
515.42–515.45.........Ethnography
515.53–515.842........History
515.9.................Local history and description
516–516.9..............Sierra Leone
516.42–516.45.........Ethnography
516.5–516.82..........History
516.9.................Local history and description
521–555.9...............French West Africa. French Sahara. West Sahara. Sahel
541–541.9..............Benin. Dahomey
541.42–541.45.........Ethnography
541.5–541.845.........History
541.9.................Local history and description
543–543.9..............Guinea
543.42–543.45.........Ethnography
543.5–543.827.........History
543.9.................Local history and description
545–545.9..............Côte d'Ivoire. Ivory Coast
545.42–545.45.........Ethnography
545.52–545.83.........History
545.9.................Local history and description
546.1–546.49...........French–speaking Equatorial Africa
546.1–546.19..........Gabon (Gaboon, Gabun)
546.142–546.145......Ethnography
546.15–546.183.......History
546.19...............Local history and description
546.2–546.29..........Congo (Brazzaville). Middle Congo
546.242–546.245......Ethnography
546.25–546.283.......History
546.29...............Local history and description
546.3–546.39..........Central African Republic. Central African Empire. Ubangi-Shari
546.342–546.345......Ethnography
546.348–546.3852.....History
546.39...............Local history and description
546.4–546.49..........Chad (Tchad)
546.442–546.445......Ethnography
546.449–546.483......History
546.49...............Local history and description
547–547.9..............Niger
547.42–547.45.........Ethnography
547.5–547.83..........History
547.9.................Local history and description
548....................West Sahara
549–549.9..............Senegal
549.42–549.45.........Ethnography
549.47–549.83.........History
549.9.................Local history and description
551–551.9..............Mali. Mali Federation. Sudanese Republic. French Sudan
551.42–551.45.........Ethnography
551.5–551.82..........History
551.9.................Local history and description
554–554.9..............Mauritania
554.42–554.45.........Ethnography
554.52–554.83.........History
554.9.................Local history and description
555–555.9..............Burkina Faso. Republic of Upper Volta. French Upper Volta.
555.42–555.45.........Ethnography
555.517–555.837.......History
555.9.................Local history and description
561–581.................Cameroon (Cameroun, Kamerun)
570–571................Ethnography
572–578.4..............History
581....................Local history and description
582–582.9...............Togo. Togoland
582.42–582.45..........Ethnography
582.5–582.82...........History
582.9..................Local history and description
591–615.9...............Portuguese–speaking West Africa
613–613.9..............Guinea-Bissau. Portuguese Guinea
613.42–613.45.........Ethnography
613.5–613.83..........History
613.9.................Local history and description
615–615.9..............São Tomé and Príncipe
615.42–615.45.........Ethnography
615.5–615.8...........History
615.9.................Local history and description
619–620.9...............Spanish West Africa
620–620.9..............Equatorial Guinea (Spanish Guinea)
620.42–620.45.........Ethnography
620.46–620.83.........History
620.9.................Local history and description
621–637.................Liberia
630–630.5..............Ethnography
630.8–636.53...........History
639.....................Congo (Kongo) River region
641–665.................Zaire. Congo (Democratic Republic). Belgian Congo
649.5–650..............Ethnography
650.2–663..............History
665....................Local history and description
669–671.................Islands
671.C2.................Cape Verde
1001–1190................Southern Africa
1054–1058...............Ethnography
1062–1182...............History
1190....................Local history and description
1251–1465................Angola
1304–1308...............Ethnography
1314–1436...............History
1450–1465...............Local history and description
1501–1685................Namibia. South–West Africa
1554–1558...............Ethnography
1564–1651...............History
1670–1685...............Local history and description
1701–2405................South Africa
1754–1770...............Ethnography
1757...................Apartheid
1758–1760..............Blacks
1772–1974...............History
1991–2054...............Cape Province. Cape of Good Hope
2075–2145...............Orange Free State. Oranje Vrystaat
2181–2278...............KwaZulu–Natal. Natal
2291–2378...............Transvaal. South African Republic
2421–2525................Botswana. Bechuanaland
2454–2458...............Ethnography
2464–2502...............History
2541–2686................Lesotho. Basutoland
2592–2596...............Ethnography
2604–2660...............History
2680–2686...............Local history and description
2701–2825...............Swaziland
2744–2746..............Ethnography
2754–2806..............History
2820–2825..............Local history and description
2831–2864...............British Central Africa. Federation of Rhodesia and Nyasaland
2871–3025...............Zimbabwe. Southern Rhodesia
2910–2913..............Ethnography
2914–3000..............History
3020–3025..............Local history and description
3031–3145...............Zambia. Northern Rhodesia
3054–3058..............Ethnography
3064–3119..............History
3140–3145..............Local history and description
3161–3257..............Malawi. Nyasaland
3189–3192.............Ethnography
3194–3237.............History
3252–3257.............Local history and description
3291–3415..............Mozambique
3324–3328.............Ethnography
3330–3398.............History
3410–3415.............Local history and description

DU – History of Oceania (South Seas) 
128.11–68..............History
80–398................Australia
108–117.2............History
120–125..............Ethnography
125.................Australian aborigines
145..................Australian Capital Territory. Canberra
150–180..............New South Wales
170–172.............History
178–180.............Local history and description
182–198..............Tasmania. Van Diemen's Land
190–195.3...........History
200–230..............Victoria
220–222.............History
228–230.............Local history and description
250–280..............Queensland
270–272.............History
278–280.............Local history and description
300–330..............South Australia
320–322.............History
328–330.............Local history and description
350–380..............Western Australia
370–372.............History
378–380.............Local history and description
390..................Central Australia
391..................Northern Australia
392–398..............Northern Territory of Australia
400–430...............New Zealand
419–422..............History
422.5–424.5..........Ethnography
422.8–424...........Maoris
428–430..............Local history and description
490..................Melanesia (General)
500..................Micronesia (General)
510..................Polynesia (General)
520–950..............Smaller Island Groups
620–629.............Hawaiian Islands. Hawaii
739–747.............New Guinea
810–819.............Samoan Islands

DX – History of Gypsies 
11–301..........History of Gypsies

References

Further reading 
 Full schedule of all LCC Classifications

D